The Schlee Brewery Historic District is a historic district in the Brewery District neighborhood of Columbus, Ohio. It was listed on the National Register of Historic Places in 1988. At the time of nomination, the site consisted of six buildings, all of which are contributing. Most are two-to-three story commercial brick buildings built between the 1860s and 1890s.

See also
 National Register of Historic Places listings in Columbus, Ohio

References

External links
 

National Register of Historic Places in Columbus, Ohio
Historic districts on the National Register of Historic Places in Ohio
1988 establishments in Ohio
Historic districts in Columbus, Ohio
Brewery District
Historic district contributing properties in Columbus, Ohio